In printing, under color removal (UCR) is a process of eliminating overlapping yellow, magenta, and cyan that would have added to a dark neutral (black) and replacing them with black ink only, called a Full Black, during the color separation process. Under color removal is used in four-color (or more colors) printing. Black ink used to add details and darkness in shadowed areas is called a Skeletal Black.

With current ink technology, the total CMYK ink in the shadows refuses to stick after it reaches the dark shadows (usually above a 250% total CMYK coverage), and begins to peel off. To prevent this, printers developed UCR, in which neutral shadows – which would have normally been produced by overprinting the four inks Cyan, Magenta, Yellow and Black on top of each other (high ink coverage) – are replaced with the single layer of Black. UCR removes the color inks under the Black, resulting in a single layer of ink which sticks to the sheet better, and saves on the consumption of ink.

There is no universal rule for UCR. The amount required will depend on the printing press, paper, and ink in use. 

Advantages: Solves the ink not sticking problem and;
Advantages: Black ink is cheaper.
Possible disadvantages: Black ink by itself in a shadow may not be dark enough, so CMY colors are added (called under color addition or UCA) to make a more accurate reproduction.

UCR is generally not recommended for use in printing, due to its tendency to produce dull-looking images and artwork. (The problem of "looking dull" can often be obviated on coated paper by use of an aqueous coating or UV coating applied on the press or as post-press. A press-applied coating can also eliminate the "ink sticking" problem.) The main exception to this rule is that where working in newsprint, UCR is the best way to avoid the associated ink limit and registration issues. UCR is also recommended for some specific paper stocks, depending on the coloration and texture of the paper.

See also
 Grey component replacement 
 Four color printing
 Rich black

Printing terminology
Print production